Gerhard Alfred Holzapfel (born May 22, 1961) is an Austrian scientist, (bio)mechanician. He is currently a Professor of Biomechanics and Head of the Institute of Biomechanics at Graz University of Technology, Austria, since 2007. He is also the International Chair of Biomechanics (adjunct professorship)  at the Norwegian University of Science and Technology (NTNU), and a visiting professor at the School of Mathematics and Statistics, University of Glasgow, Scotland. He was a Professor of Biomechanics at KTH Royal Institute of Technology in Stockholm, Sweden, for 9 years (7 years as an adjunct professor) until 2013. He is the co-founder and co-editor-in-chief of the international scientific journal Biomechanics and Modeling in Mechanobiology by Springer Nature since the first issue published in June 2002.

Holzapfel is widely known for his contributions to the fields of nonlinear solid mechanics, constitutive and computational modeling of fiber-reinforced materials and soft biological tissues including blood vessels in health and disease. He has been listed as a Highly Cited Researcher in Engineering selected by ISI Web of Science, Thomson Reuters and listed as "The World's Most Influential Scientific Minds: 2014".  His graduate textbook, Nonlinear Solid Mechanics: A Continuum Approach for Engineering published in 2000, has become a standard reference in the area of solid mechanics.

Education and training 
Gerhard A. Holzapfel received his M.S. degree in Civil Engineering and his Ph.D. in Mechanical Engineering from Graz University of Technology in 1985 and 1990, respectively. In 1991, he traveled to Shenyang in the Northeast of P.R. China to work as a visiting scholar at an institution currently part of the Shenyang University. Then, he received a Schrödinger Scholarship from the  Austrian Science Fund (Wissenschaftsfonds FWF) to work as a Post-Doctoral Fellow at the Division of Applied Mechanics, Department of Mechanical Engineering, Stanford University, CA, USA, with the late Professor Juan C. Simo from 1993 to 1995. He received his Habilitation in Mechanics from the Vienna University of Technology, Austria, in 1996. From May 1987 to November 2004, he was an Assistant at the Institute of Strength of Materials and then an Associate Professor at the Institute of Structural Analysis, Graz University of Technology, Austria.

Research 
Holzapfel's research has mainly focused on nonlinear continuum mechanics, multi-scale constitutive modeling of solids at finite strains including fiber reinforcement, computational methods, fracture, and material failure. He has made seminal contributions to biomechanics, embracing experiments, continuum mechanics modeling and finite element implementations for a variety of soft biological tissues including artery walls, heart tissue, and brain tissues. 

In recent years, he has increasingly directed his attention towards the biomechanics and mechanobiology of soft biological tissues, the cardiovascular system including blood vessels in health and diseases such as aneurysm and aortic dissection, therapeutic interventions such as balloon angioplasty and stent implantation.

He has also made contributions in experimental biomechanics addressing phenomena at the nano, micro, or macrolevels. He used polarized light microscopy, second-harmonic imaging, and two-photon excitation microscopy together with medical image processing to visualize the nanostructure of soft tissues.

Besides his well-known textbook Nonlinear Solid Mechanics: A Continuum Approach for Engineering, two of the constitutive models proposed by his group and longtime collaborator Ray Ogden are now referred to as the 
 
and 
 
models which have been implemented in commercial software such as Simulia Abaqus

Awards and honors 
Holzapfel has received many awards and honors including the following:

 1993-1994: Schrödinger Scholarship for post-doctoral training at Stanford University with the late Professor Juan C. Simo.
 1997: Austrian Start-Prize from the Austrian Science Fund, the highest Austrian award for young scientists.
 2003: Josef-Krainer Würdigungspreis for exceptional achievements in the field of biomechanics.
 2011: Erwin Schrödinger Prize by the Austrian Academy of Sciences for lifetime achievements by Austrians in the fields of mathematics and natural sciences.
 2012: Founding Fellow of EAMBES – European Alliance for Medical and Biological Engineering & Science.
 2012: Elected as a corresponding member of the Austrian Academy of Sciences.
 2014: Elected as a member of the Academia Europaea.
 2014: Highly Cited Researcher in Engineering by Thomson Reuters.
 2015: Fellow of European Mechanics Society.
 2018: Elected Member of World Council on Biomechanics.
 2019: Elected as an ordinary member of the European Academy of Sciences and Arts.
 2020: Eugenio Beltrami Senior Scientist Prize.
 2021: William Prager Medal from the Society of Engineering Science (United States).
 2021: Warner T. Koiter Medal from the American Society of Mechanical Engineers (United States).

Selected publications 

Holzapfel has authored a graduate textbook and co-edited seven books. He contributed chapters to 20+ other books, and published 220+ peer-reviewed journal articles. Some of his most influential publications include:

References

External links
 Holzapfel's homepage at TU Graz
 CV of Holzapfel
 Holzapfel's homepage at NTNU
 

Austrian engineers
Academic staff of the Graz University of Technology
Stanford University staff
Academic staff of the Norwegian University of Science and Technology
Living people
Academic staff of the KTH Royal Institute of Technology
Scientists from Graz
1961 births